Busso is an Italian surname. Notable people with the surname include:

 Elena Busso (born 1976), Italian volleyball player
 Giuseppe Busso, Italian vehicle designer

See also
Bussow
Busson (surname)

Italian-language surnames